Burton Maxwell Hill (21 June 1883 – 7 January 1963) was a Liberal party member of the House of Commons of Canada. He was born in St. Stephen, New Brunswick, and became a civil engineer by career.

Hill attended school in St. Stephen then the University of New Brunswick where he received a Bachelor of Science for engineering. From 1918 to 1925, he was the New Brunswick provincial Deputy Minister of Public Works. In 1925, Hill became a full provincial minister of Public Works under Premier Peter Veniot, but resigned later that year after the government was defeated in an election where Hill did not win a seat.

In 1929 and 1930, he was commissioner for the Saint John Harbour Board.

He was first elected to Parliament at the Charlotte riding in the 1935 general election and re-elected there in 1940. After completing his second term, the 19th Canadian Parliament, Hill did not seek further re-election and left federal office at the 1945 election.

Electoral history

References

External links
 

1883 births
1963 deaths
Canadian civil engineers
Members of the House of Commons of Canada from New Brunswick
Members of the Executive Council of New Brunswick
Liberal Party of Canada MPs
University of New Brunswick alumni